The USA Volleyball Cup or sometimes called USAV Cup is an annual indoor volleyball event organized by USA Volleyball.
The USAV CUP is an initiative of the USA Volleyball that draw elite teams to the United States to compete with the U.S. Men's and Women's National Indoor Volleyball Teams.

This provides the chance for the local communities around the U.S. specially to the host city of USA Volleyball, Anaheim, to watch world-class competition of women's volleyball.

In every tour series, at least one match will be played in Southern California and one throughout the country.

The USA Volleyball Cup was inaugurated in 2013 with the U.S. Women's National Team hosting Japan's Women's National Team.

The following year, the U.S. Men's National Team started the men's tour of USAV Cup hosting Iran's Men's National Team.

2013
The inaugural year of USA Volleyball Cup only had the women's series. Japan's women's volleyball team accepted the U.S. invitation.
The event served as a preparation to the 2013 FIVB World Grand Prix.

Prior to this tour series, the U.S. Women's National Team hosted Japan during the spring of 2000 with matches in Burleston, Texas, Pueblo, Colorado, Colorado Spring and Denver.

Japan won three of the four matches with three of the matches extending to a fifth set. In Pueblo, Colo., Japan won the contest with a 25–23 score in the fifth set. The  single victory of U.S. also came to a five-set match.

U.S. Women vs Japan
All matches of the 2013 USA Volleyball Cup took place in Southern California.
Match 1Venue: RIMAC Arena, UC San Diego, La Jolla, San Diego, CA

|}
Match 2Venue: Walter Pyramid, Long Beach State Long Beach, CA

|}
Match 3Venue: JSerra Pavilion, JSerra Catholic High School, San Juan Capistrano, CA

|}

 USA won the series against Japan, 3–0

2014
For this year's USAV Cup, the U.S. women hosted Brazil Women's National Team. In addition to the women's series, the U.S. Men's National Team were introduced to the USAV Cup with the inclusion of men's series.
The U.S. men hosted the I.R. Iran men's national team. This marked the first time the Iran's volleyball team compete on U.S. soil.

The 2014 USAV Cup featured four exhibition games for both men and women. It also served as a preparation for the 2014 FIVB World Championship.

U.S. Women vs Brazil
Match 1Venue: Bren Events Center, UC Irvine, Irvine, CA

|}
Match 2Venue: Galen Center, USC, Los Angeles, CA

|}
Match 3Venue: Stan Sheriff Center, UH Manoa, Honolulu, HI

|}
Match 4Venue: Stan Sheriff Center, UH Manoa, Honolulu, HI

|}

USA swept Brazil, 4–0

U.S. Men vs Iran
Match 1Venue: Galen Center, USC, Los Angeles, CA

|}
Match 2Venue: Anaheim Convention Center, Anaheim Resort, Anaheim, CA

|}
Match 3Venue: Viejas Arena, San Diego State, San Diego, CA

|}
Match 4Venue: Bren Events Center, UC Irvine, Irvine, CA

|}

USA beat Iran, 3–1

2015
The 2015 USAV Cup featured China as the visiting team. This series was viewed as the continuation of the 2014 World Championship finals where the same two teams met.
The USA emerged victorious and taking the World Champion title and trophy.

The U.S. Men hosted Brazil for the 2015 USAV Cup. The seven served as a preparation of U.S. Men for the 2015 World Cup.

U.S. Women vs China

Match 1Venue: Stan Sheriff Center, UH Manoa, Honolulu, HI

|}

Match 2Venue: Stan Sheriff Center, UH Manoa, Honolulu, HI

|}

Match 3Venue: Bren Events Center, UC Irvine, Irvine, CA

|}

Match 4Venue: Coussoulis Arena, Cal State San Bernardino, San Bernardino, CA

|}

 Series tied at 2–2

U.S. Men vs Brazil

Match 1Venue: Walter Pyramid, Long Beach State, Long Beach, CA

|}

Match 2Venue: Jenny Craig Pavilion, University of San Diego, San Diego, CA

|}

Match 3Venue: Galen Center, USC, Los Angeles, CA

|}

Match 4Venue: Bren Events Center, UC Irvine, Irvine, CA

|}

 Brazil beat the event host, 3–1

2016
The men's series of this year's USAV Cup was shorter than the previous editions with only two-exhibition games. The U.S. men hosted Japan.

The men's series was scheduled slightly earlier than the previous editions. Few of the leading players of U.S. men's team were still competing abroad making them unable to participate in the event.

The event served as a preparation of Japan for the 2016 World Olympic Qualification.

U.S. Men vs Japan

Match 1Venue: Galen Center, USC, Los Angeles, CA

|}
Match 2Venue: Walter Pyramid, Long Beach State, Long Beach, CA

|}
Series tied at 1–1

2017

The men's series of this year's USAV Cup was like the previous edition with only two-exhibition games. The U.S. men hosted Brazil.

The event served as a preparation for both teams to the 2017 FIVB Volleyball Men's World Grand Champions Cup.

U.S. Men vs Brazil

Match 1Venue: Sears Centre Arena, Hoffman Estates, Illinois.

|}
Match 2Venue: Sears Centre Arena, Hoffman Estates, Illinois.

|}
Brazil won both matches, by 3-0 and 3-2.

U.S Women vs Brazil

The event serves as a preparation for both teams to the 2017 FIVB Volleyball Women's World Grand Champions Cup.

Match 1Venue: Anaheim Convention Center, Anaheim, California.

|}
Match 2Venue: Anaheim Convention Center, Anaheim, California.

|}

See also
United States men's national volleyball team
United States women's national volleyball team

References

External links
 USA Volleyball official website

Volleyball in the United States
Volleyball competitions in the United States